No Living Witness is a 1932 American pre-Code crime film directed by E. Mason Hopper and written by Norman Houston. The film stars Gilbert Roland, Noah Beery Sr., Barbara Kent, Carmel Myers, Otis Harlan, Dorothy Revier, J. Carrol Naish, Ferike Boros and John Ince. The film was released on September 15, 1932, by Mayfair Pictures.

Cast          
Gilbert Roland as Jerry Bennett
Noah Beery Sr. as Clyde Corbin
Barbara Kent as Carol Everett
Carmel Myers as Emillia
Otis Harlan as Pop Everett
Dorothy Revier as Miss Thompson
J. Carrol Naish as Nick
Ferike Boros as Nick's Mother
John Ince as Police Captain
Monte Carter as Looey
Broderick O'Farrell as District Attorney
Arthur Millett as Harry Newton
James Cooley as Fatty Raskin
Gordon De Main as Eddie Schrabe

References

External links
 

1932 films
American crime films
1932 crime films
Films directed by E. Mason Hopper
Mayfair Pictures films
1930s English-language films
1930s American films